Hiiumaa Islets Landscape Conservation Area is a protected area situated in Hiiu County, Estonia. Its area is 3224 ha.

With Käina Bay, there is designated a Ramsar site called Hiiumaa Islets and Käina Bay. The area of this Ramsar site is 17,000 ha.

References

Nature reserves in Estonia
Ramsar sites in Estonia
Geography of Hiiu County
Tourist attractions in Hiiu County